Giovanni Mario Alessandri was an Italian Hispanist and grammarian from the 16th century.

He spent a time at the Spanish royal court and he wrote the first Spanish grammar for Italians, Il Paragone della Lingua Toscana et Castigliana (Nápoles: Mattia Cancer, 1560). There he is particularly careful with phonetics. This work was inspirational for Giovanni Miranda's Osservationi de la lingua castigliana.

References

Italian Hispanists
Grammarians from Italy
Linguists of Spanish
16th-century Italian writers